Bound, Gagged and Blindfolded is the debut full-length album by American groove metal band Skinlab. It was recorded at Hyde Street Studios in San Francisco, California, and was produced by Andy Sneap. The album was released July 8, 1997, and re-issued with bonus material in October 2007.

Track listing
All lyrics by Steev Esquivel, all music by Skinlab, except where noted.
 "When Pain Comes to Surface" – 4:29 (Music: Skinlab and Brian Regan)
 "Dissolve" – 3:50
 "Race of Hate" – 5:12
 "Paleface" – 4:24 (Music: Skinlab and Adam Albright)
 "Down" – 4:09
 "Promised" – 6:43
 "Stumble" – 4:08
 "The Art of Suffering" – 5:03
 "Ten Seconds" – 4:53 (Music: Skinlab and Albright)

References

1997 debut albums
Albums produced by Andy Sneap
Century Media Records albums
Skinlab albums